In  Greek mythology, Pallas was, according to Hesiod, the son of the Titans Crius and Eurybia, the brother of Astraeus and Perses, the husband of Styx, and the father of Zelus ("Zeal" or "Emulation"), Nike ("Victory"), Kratos ("Strength" or "Power"), and Bia ("Might" or "Force"). Hyginus says that Pallas, whom he calls "the giant", also fathered with Styx: Scylla, Fontus ("Fountains") and Lacus ("Lakes"). Pallas was sometimes regarded as the Titan god of warcraft and of the springtime campaign season.

The Homeric Hymn "To Hermes" makes the moon goddess Selene (usually the daughter of the Titans Hyperion and Theia), the daughter of a Pallas, son of (an otherwise unknown) Megamedes, which is possibly the same as this Pallas. Ovid uses the patronymic "Pallantias" or "Pallantis" as another name for Aurora, the Roman equivalent of the Greek Eos ("Dawn"), who was the sister of Selene; Ovid apparently regarding Aurora (or Eos) as the daughter of (or otherwise related to) Pallas.

The Suda in discussing Athena's epithet "Pallas" suggests a possible derivation "from brandishing (pallein) the spear". The geographer Pausanias reports that Pellene, a city in Achaea, was claimed by its inhabitants to be named after Pallas, while the Argives claimed it was named for the Argive Pellen.

Notes

References
 Apollodorus, Apollodorus, The Library, with an English Translation by Sir James George Frazer, F.B.A., F.R.S. in 2 Volumes. Cambridge, Massachusetts, Harvard University Press; London, William Heinemann Ltd. 1921.  Online version at the Perseus Digital Library.
 Daly, Kathleen N. Greek and Roman Mythology, A to Z (3rd ed.) U.S.A., InfoBase Publishing, 2009. Internet Archive.
 Evelyn-White, Hugh, The Homeric Hymns and Homerica with an English Translation by Hugh G. Evelyn-White. Homeric Hymns. Cambridge, Massachusetts.,Harvard University Press; London, William Heinemann Ltd. 1914.
 Frazer, James George, Fastorum libri sex: the Fasti of Ovid, Volume 4, Macmillan and Company, limited, 1929.
 Hard, Robin, The Routledge Handbook of Greek Mythology: Based on H.J. Rose's "Handbook of Greek Mythology", Psychology Press, 2004, .
 Hesiod, Theogony, in The Homeric Hymns and Homerica with an English Translation by Hugh G. Evelyn-White, Cambridge, Massachusetts.,Harvard University Press; London, William Heinemann Ltd. 1914. Online version at the Perseus Digital Library.
 Keightley, Thomas, The Mythology of Ancient Greece and Italy, G. Bell and Sons, 1877.
 Pausanias, Pausanias Description of Greece with an English Translation by W.H.S. Jones, Litt.D., and H.A. Ormerod, M.A., in 4 Volumes. Cambridge, Massachusetts, Harvard University Press; London, William Heinemann Ltd. 1918. Online version at the Perseus Digital Library.
 Vergados, Athanassios, The "Homeric Hymn to Hermes": Introduction, Text and Commentary, Walter de Gruyter, 2012. .
 Smith, William; Dictionary of Greek and Roman Biography and Mythology, London (1873). "Pallas" , "Pallantias"
 York, Michael, The Divine versus the Asurian: an Interpretation of Indo-European Cult and Myth, International Scholars Publications, 1995. .

Titans (mythology)
Greek war deities
Mythology of Achaea
Spring deities